Cucullia speyeri, common names Speyer's paint, Speyer's cucullia or Speyer's hooded owlet moth, is a moth found in North America. It is found from Alberta and Montana to the Atlantic coast from New Hampshire to Virginia. It was described by Joseph Albert Lintner in 1874. In the US state of Connecticut, it is listed as a species of special concern and is believed to be extirpated. The habitat consists of open meadows, dry grasslands and native prairies.

The forewings are pale grey and finely streaked. The hindwings are white with a dark margin. Adults are on wing in late spring and summer.

The larvae feed on herbaceous Asteraceae and Conyza species.

References

Cucullia
Moths of North America
Moths described in 1874
Taxa named by Joseph Albert Lintner